Buffalo Lake may refer to:

Settlements
Buffalo Lake, Minnesota, U.S.

Lakes

Canada
Buffalo Lake (Alberta)
Buffalo Lake (Northwest Territories)

United States
Buffalo Lake (Murray County, Minnesota)
Buffalo Lake (Waseca County, Minnesota)
Buffalo Lake (Wright County, Minnesota)
Buffalo Lake National Wildlife Refuge (North Dakota)
Buffalo Lake (Minnehaha County, South Dakota)
Buffalo Lakes, a lake chain in South Dakota
Buffalo Lake National Wildlife Refuge, Randall County, Texas
Lake Buffalo, in South Dakota

Other uses
 Buffalo Lake (HBC vessel), a Hudson's Bay Company vessel

See also
Buffalo River (disambiguation)